3-D The Catalogue is the second official live album and most recent release by German electronic music band Kraftwerk. It was released on 26 May 2017 and was released on several formats, including a four-disc Blu-ray box set, an eight-disc CD box set and a nine-disc vinyl box set. It consists of live versions of every studio album Kraftwerk song from Autobahn (1974) to Tour de France Soundtracks (2003). The performances were recorded between April 2012 and October 2016 at venues around the world. The album was nominated for Best Surround Sound Album and won Best Dance/Electronic Album at the 60th Annual Grammy Awards, marking the band's first Grammy win.

Contents 
According to the liner notes, the album documents Kraftwerk's 1 2 3 4 5 6 7 8 tour at various museums and concert halls around the world:
 Museum of Modern Art in New York City (9–17 April 2012)
 Kunstsammlung Nordrhein-Westfalen in Düsseldorf (11–20 January 2013)
 Tate Modern in London (6–14 February 2013)
 Akasaka Blitz in Tokyo (8–16 May 2013)
 Sydney Opera House (24–27 May 2013)
 Walt Disney Concert Hall in Los Angeles (18–21 March 2014)
 Burgtheater in Vienna (15–18 May 2014)
 Fondation Louis Vuitton in Paris (6–14 November 2014)
 Neue Nationalgalerie in Berlin (6-13 January 2015)
 Paradiso in Amsterdam (16–23 January 2015)
 DR Koncerthuset in Copenhagen (26 February – 1 March 2015)
 Oslo Opera House (4–7 August 2016)
 Guggenheim Museum Bilbao (7–14 October 2016)

Track listing 
CD

Awards and achievements

Grammy Awards 

|-
| rowspan="2"| 2018
| rowspan="2"| 3-D The Catalogue
| Best Dance/Electronic Album
| 
|-
| Best Surround Sound Album
| 
|}

Charts

Weekly charts

Year-end charts

References 

2017 live albums
Kling Klang Studio albums
Kraftwerk live albums
Parlophone live albums
Grammy Award for Best Dance/Electronica Album